Nokuse Plantation is a nature preserve in northwest Florida's Walton County. Founded in 2000, it is funded by timber and oil commodities trader Marion Clifton Davis and his wife, Stella Davis, who both became deeply interested in ecology. Its name, Nokuse, is the Native American word for black bear in the Muscogee language, an umbrella species on the preserve. Its purpose is to "restore and preserve viable ecosystems" and "support native plants and animals, from common species to rare, endemic species" while partnering with businesses in the private sector, as well as government and the scientific community. For example, the reserve serves as a haven for the locally threatened gopher tortoise, an inhabitant of longleaf pine forests. Tortoises recovered from local urbanised areas have been released into the reserve.

Davis focused on buying land for Nokuse in the "Northwest Florida Greenway area" because of the availability of large tracts of land and because the Florida Panhandle was one of six designated biological, hyperdiverse, "hotspots" in the United States. Davis spent an estimated  $90 million purchasing land for Nokuse. The majority of property was purchased from timber companies and is being restored to "Piney woods" with eight million seedlings planted as of 2015. Longleaf pine forests once covered about 40 million acres (160,000 km2) across the American South but almost all of those original trees had been cut down by the 1930s. A wildlife underpass connects Nokuse with Eglin Air Force Base, on which there is remnant longleaf pine forest, with some 500-year-old trees.

Davis has pledged a large share of his fortune to this environmental education center and to the conservation trust.

The plantation and M.C. Davis were featured in Wildlands Philanthropy: The Great American Tradition. The book covers various historical and modern philanthropists, who dedicated their wealth to conservation.

References

External links

Nature parks
Protected areas of Florida
Walton County, Florida